Tom Edwards (born 20 March 1945 in Norwich, England) is a British radio presenter and television announcer.

Early radio career
Edwards began work as a journalist, then became the announcer on the Border Television programme Beat the Border. He worked for Radio City and Radio Caroline in the 1960s, and later for BBC Radio 1 and BBC Radio 2, presenting the early Saturday morning show on the latter in the 1970s and early 1980s. In 1968, Edwards replaced Simon Dee on "Midday Spin" on Radio 1 and Radio 2. In the 1970s he worked as a presenter on BBC East's daily morning regional opt-outs from the Today programme on BBC Radio 4.

TV career
Edwards might be best known as the in-vision announcer for Thames Television for most of the 1980s, also working for ATV and HTV West. In the late 1980s he moved to the United States but soon returned to Britain. He worked on BBC Radio Norfolk in the 1990s. He has appeared occasionally on Saga Radio. He presented shows on Pirate BBC Essex on board the LV18 ship in 2004 and 2007. Easter bank holiday weekend 2009 was the 45th anniversary of Radio Caroline.  Edwards returned to Pirate BBC Essex on board the LV18 at Ha'penny Pier in Harwich.

Later career
In April 2009 Edwards and David Clayton, editor of BBC Radio Norfolk, compiled an hour-long story of his life. Edwards The Confessor was broadcast on Monday 31 August. Edwards followed with two hours of music from his pirate radio days and those of Radios 1 and 2. He has written a biography, suggested by Bob Monkhouse when they worked on the television series Wipeout in the late 1990s. His book "Is Anybody There", was published by Kaleidoscope on 8 December 2018. Edwards used to open his show by knocking on the microphone three times and saying "Is Anybody There".

Is Anybody There? - 2018
Edward's autobiography Is Anybody There? was published in December 2018. During an interview to promote the book he states, "My book is a turbulent read but I hope you enjoy it and you can join me on a journey that took me here, there and just about everywhere." Not only does the book highlight his varied and successful career as a DJ in pirate and commercial radio, and as a TV broadcaster working for the BBC and many other TV companies, plus a spell in Hollywood, the book also delves into Edwards' personal battle with alcohol and drug addiction which he successfully overcame after spending three years in rehab.

Family
Edwards lives in the village of Heckington in Lincolnshire. On 2 April 2016, Tom presented an evening with Tom Edwards under the title ‘Edwards the Confessor’ at Heckington Village Hall, during which he spoke about his life and his Radio and TV career.

Edwards who gave the DJ Tallulah, born Martyn Allam, the name "Tallulah" on a Sunday night at a pub in Herne Bay. The name stuck.

Further References
 BBC - Tom Edwards  
 Tom Edwards - The Pirate Radio Hall of Fame 
 Tom Edwards - Getty Images

Notes and references

External links
Official Tom Edwards Website

1945 births
Living people
British radio personalities
British radio DJs
British television presenters
Radio and television announcers
Offshore radio broadcasters
Pirate radio personalities
People from Norwich